Kamal Abdel Hafiz Adwan (1935 - April 10, 1973), also spelt as Kamal Udwan, was a Palestinian politician and one of the top leaders in the Palestinian Liberation Organization. He was killed during a 1973 Israeli raid in Lebanon.

Early life and education

Kamal Adwan was born in the village of Barbara in Mandatory Palestine. He lived there until the village was taken by Israeli troops during the 1948 Arab–Israeli War. It was recorded that the village was depopulated of its 2,800 Palestinian inhabitants, who became refugees in the Gaza Strip and surrounding Arab countries.

When he was thirteen years old, Adwan settled as a refugee in Gaza where he completed his secondary education. He then worked as a teacher during the early 1950s before moving to Egypt to pursue his secondary education to qualify as a petroleum engineer.

Political role in the Palestinian National Movement

Adwan joined the Palestinian national movement in 1952, when he helped to establish the “justice battalion" in Gaza with Khalil al-Wazir, who was later killed by  Mossad in 1988.

He then spent his first year as a graduate in Saudi Arabia before he moved to Qatar where he met other Fatah founders including Yasser Arafat. He was one of the founders of Fateh, the Palestinian national movement. He held several political and military positions which included the following:
 Member of the central committee of the Fateh movement,
 Member of the Palestinian national council, the Palestinian Parliament in exile,
 Responsible for the media centre of the Palestine Liberation Organization (PLO)
 Leader of Fateh mechanisms in the West Bank (Western sector)
 Adwan had also played a major role in the foundation of Palestinian universities in the Palestinian territories during the early 1970s.

Death
According to Israeli sources, Adwan was directly involved in the Black September Organization. After obtaining approval from Israeli Prime Minister Golda Meir, Mossad began a covert mission called Operation Wrath of God in response to the 1972 Munich massacre. During the operation, several Palestinian militants were killed. The operation in which Kamal was killed was code-named Operation Spring of Youth.

In an analysis extrapolated from an interview with a Mossad agent involved in Operation Spring of Youth, and contrary to the Israeli claim that the "Verdun operation" came after the kidnapping and killing of Israeli athletes in Munich, Operation Wrath of God was planned months ahead of the Olympic games crisis, and was not a related to a Black September. In his book, The Israeli Secret Services, Ami Pedahzur claims that Adwan seemed to have little or no connection to the Munich hostage crisis, suggesting Mossad's non-involvement in his death. According to Mohammad Odeh Dawood (AKA Abu Dawood), who published his book, From Jerusalem to Munich, Adwan claimed he and two other leaders were masterminds of the Munich hostage crisis.

Kamal was killed in his flat in Beirut, in front of his wife, by Israeli commandos on 10 April 1973 as part of Operation Spring of Youth. Both Kamal Nasser, a charismatic poet and writer, and Mohammad Abu-Youssef al Najjar, a lawyer by profession, were killed in the same attack. His killing came nine months after the murders of Ghassan Kanafani, a Palestinian novelist and a member of FPLP, and his 17-year-old niece, Lamees. An innocent 79 year old Italian woman, living in the same building was also killed, as well as several Lebanese policemen. Two of the attackers were killed by Palestinian defenders during their withdrawal. Ehud Barak, who was elected prime minister of Israel in the late nineties, was among the commanders of the raid.

The killing of the three Palestinian leaders opened nearly twenty years of a tit for tat battle between the PLO and the Mossad all over the world.

Legacy

Half a million mourners attended the funeral of Kamal Adwan and his comrades in Beirut. Despite over 40 years having elapsed since his death, Adwan is still remembered by Palestinians as a hero who dedicated his life to the Palestinian cause. A hospital in Gaza is named after him. As a key political figure, his name is frequently mentioned in political literature related to the Palestinian struggle in the period between 1956 and 1973.

References

1935 births
1973 deaths
Operation Wrath of God
People killed in Mossad operations
Palestine Liberation Organization members
Central Committee of Fatah members